Damien Jalet (born 17 August 1976) is a Belgo-French freelance choreographer, dancer and performer working internationally. His work is often collaborative, creating intricate bounds between dance and other artistic media such as visual art, fashion, theater and music.

Life and career 
Damien Jalet was born in Uccle, Belgium. He worked as choreographer and performer for Companies like Ballet C. de la B., Sasha Waltz et Invités, Chunky Move, Eastman, NYDC, Hessiches Staatballet, l’Opéra de Paris, Scottish Dance Theater, Iceland Dance Company and many others.

Damien Jalet began to study theater at the National Institute of the performing art of Brussels, before moving to modern dance and completed his training in New York City.

Since 2000 he has been working as the closest and most regular collaborator of Sidi Larbi Cherkaoui, within Les ballets C. de la B. As a result of this collaboration, Damien Jalet created his own shows, first of all as a dancer, but also on the dramatically aspects, staging and music.

In May 2013, he created in collaboration with Cherkaoui and performance artist Marina Abramović, a new version of Ravel's Bolero for the Paris Opera Ballet. Costumes were designed by Givenchy's artistic director Riccardo Tisci and the 11 dancer's cast included étoiles Aurélie Dupont, Marie Agnès Gillot and Jérémie Bélingard.

Damien Jalet has been entitled “Chevalier de l’Ordre des Arts et des Lettres” by the French government in 2013.
In 2014, he signed Yama’s choreography, a play written for the Scottish Dance Theater, with the American stage designer Jim Hodges and the original composition made by the Winter Family group. He also imagined the solo “inked” for the Kathak Aakash Ordera's dancer.

Damien Jalet is laureate of Villa Kujoyama in Kyoto 2015, where he developed Vessel, a six months work collaboration with the visual artist Kohei Nawa, which premiered in September 2016 at the new Rhom Theater Kyoto. The relationship work of Jalet to existing rituals practiced in volcanic islands such as Bali and Japan is at the center of the 70 minutes documentary The Ferryman by Gilles Delmas, narrated by Marina Abramović with the artistic participation of Ryuichi Sakamoto.

Recently, his show Skid (2017) for the Opera's Dance Company of Gothenburg in Sweden, presented 17 performers and dancers on a 10 meters scene sloping at 34 degrees during approximately 40 minutes. This surprising stage design is also signed by the Jim Hodges.

In 2018, he choreographed the remake Suspiria, an American-Italian horror film directed by Luca Guadagnino, and presented for the first time at the Venice Film Festival. Starring Dakota Johnson, Chloë Grace Moretz, Mia Goth and Tilda Swinton, the film is based on Dario Argento's eponymous film, released in 1977.

Jalet choreographed the short Paul Thomas Anderson 2019 dance film Anima, starring Thom Yorke and featuring music from Yorke's 2019 solo album of the same name.

Main choreographies 
 Creations

 2002 : D’Avant in collaboration with  Sidi Larbi Cherkaoui, Juan Kruz diaz de Garaio Esnaola et Luc Dunberry; 
 2005 : The Unclear Age with Erna Omarsdottir (video dance); 
 2005 : Ofætt (Unborn) with Erna Omarsdottir and Gabríela Friðriksdóttir; 
 2008 : Three Spells with Christian Fennesz; 
 2009 : Transaquania-Out of the Blue in collaboration with Erna Omarsdottir and Gabríela Friðriksdóttir for the Iceland Dance Company; 
 2009 : Black Marrow in collaboration with Erna Omarsdottir for the Company Chunky Move; 
 2010 : Transaquania into Thin Air in collaboration with Erna Omarsdottir and Gabríela Friðriksdóttir;
 2013 : Les Médusés, choreography in the Louvre Museum in Paris;
 2014 : Yama for the Scottish Dance Theatre;
 2015 : Gravity Fatigue avec Hussein Chalayan au Sadler's Wells Theatre, London; 
 2016 : Thr(o)ugh for the Hessiches Staatballet;
 2016 : Babel 7.16, a duo with Sidi Larbi Cherkaoui, dans la cour d'honneur du Palais des Papes, Avignon;
 2016 : Vessel, in collaboration with Nawa Kohei, at the Theatre Rhom, Kyoto;
 2017 : Tarantiseismic for the National Youth Dance Company at the Sadler's Wells, London; 
 2017 : Skid for the Goteborg Danskompani, Gothenburg
 2018 : Suspiria, directed by Luca Guadagnino.
2019 : Anima, directed by Paul Thomas Anderson.

 Collaboration with Sidi Larbi Cherkaoui

 2010 : BABEL (words), a collaboration with Antony Gormley;
 2013 : Boléro, a collaboration with Marina Abramović, Opera Garnier, Paris;
 2018 : Pelléas et Mélisande, a collaboration with Marina Abramović, Anvers

Theater and opera 
 2006 : L'Image from Samuel Beckett's play, staging by Arthur Nauzyciel, Dublin, National Theater of Icelande Reykjavik and Festival " Les Grandes Traversées " in Bordeaux (France) in 2007; 
 2006 : Il cielo sulla terra; 
 2008 : Julius Caesar; 
 2008 : Ordet (The Word), from the text written by Kaj Munk;
 2009 : The Sea Museum, from the text written by Marie Darrieussecq;
 2011 : Jan Karski (mon nom est une fiction), stagging by Arthur Nauzyciel;
 2014: Splendid's of Jean Genet, staging by Arthur Nauzyciel.

Awards 
 2011 : Laurence Olivier awards (United Kingdom) with Sidi Larbi Cherkaoui for Babel (words) ; 
 2011 : Benois de la danse (Russia) with Sidi Larbi Cherkaoui pour Babel (words);
 2013 : Chevalier dans l'Ordre des Arts et des Lettres by the French Government;
 2014 : United Humans Award (with Sidi Larbi Cherkaoui);
 2015 : Grimman awards, Iceland. Choreography of the year for Les medusées; 
 2017 : Nomination for the Faust awards (Germany) with Thr(o)ugh.

References

External links 
Authority records : 
National Library of France
Official site of Damien Jalet
National theater of brittany
Official website of the company Eastman

1976 births
Living people
Belgian choreographers